Elan or Élan may refer to:

People
Elan Atias (born 1975), American singer-songwriter
Elán (musician) (born 1983), Mexican singer
Poets of Elan, a group of Ecuadorian poets

Fictional characters
Elan (Order of the Stick), a character in the webcomic The Order of the Stick
Elan (Dungeons & Dragons), a fictional race in Dungeons & Dragons
Elan (Star Wars Legends), a Star Wars character

Places
Élan, Ardennes, a commune of the Ardennes département in France
Elan Valley, a valley in Wales
Afon Elan, a river in Wales
Elan (Prut), a river in eastern Romania
Élan School, a private boarding school in Poland, Maine
 Elan, Bichursky District, Republic of Buryatia

Companies
Elan (company), a Slovenian sports equipment company
Élan, a pharmaceutical company based in Athlone, County Roscommon, Ireland
Élan Motorsport Technologies, a race car manufacturing consortium based in the United States
ELAN Microelectronics Corp., a Taiwanese manufacturer of microcontrollers

Music
Elán (band), a Slovak rock band
"Élan" (song), a 2015 single by Nightwish
Elan (Firefall album), 1978
Elan (Mari Hamada album), 2005

Acronyms
Early left anterior negativity, an event-related potential in electrophysiology
 ELAN, acronym for Elliniko Laiko Apeleftherotiko Naftiko, the Greek People's Liberation Navy

Computing and software
Elan, another name for the 1980s Enterprise 128 home computer
Elan Graphics, computer graphics subsystem for mid-1990s Silicon Graphics workstations
ELAN (programming language), an educational programming language developed in the 1970s
ELAN (software) (The EUDICO Linguistic Annotator), software for transcription and annotation of audio and video

Other uses
Kia Elan, car model
Lotus Elan, a car model
Elan (snowmobile), a model of snowmobile made by Skidoo
Elan (magazine), an online lifestyle publication
French sloop Élan

See also
Elan Vital (disambiguation)
Elaan (disambiguation)
Eland (disambiguation)
Elam (disambiguation)
Ilan (disambiguation)